A by-election to the House of Representatives was held for the Portland Eastern constituency on April 4, 2019. The seat was declared vacant due to the murder of member of Parliament Dr. Lynvale Bloomfield on February 2, 2019. The election was won by Ann-Marie Vaz of the Jamaica Labour Party.

Background
On March 1, 2019, Prime Minister Andrew Holness announced that the by-election for the Portland Eastern parliamentary seat would be contested on March 25 with nomination day scheduled for March 8. However, due to the Ash Wednesday public holiday falling that year on March 6, it did not allow for the five clear days between the announcement of the by-election and Nomination day as stipulated under the Representation of the People's Act.  On March 4, 2019, the Prime Minister announced that Nomination day would be on March 15, 2019 with the election date set for April 4, 2019.

Dates

Result

See also
 Politics of Jamaica
 Elections in Jamaica

References

2019 elections in the Caribbean
2019 in Jamaica
By-elections in Jamaica